Willis Allison Carto (July 17, 1926 – October 26, 2015) was an American far-right political activist. He described himself as a Jeffersonian and a populist, but was primarily known for his promotion of antisemitic conspiracy theories and Holocaust denial.

Carto was known for the Liberty Lobby and successor racial extremist organizations which he helped create. Carto ran a group supporting segregationist George Wallace's 1968 presidential campaign and reorganized the group into the National Youth Alliance, which promoted Francis Parker Yockey's ideology. Carto helped found the Populist Party, which served as an electoral vehicle for white supremacist group and Ku Klux Klan members, such as David Duke in the 1988 presidential election and Christian Identity supporter Bo Gritz in 1992. Carto ran the American Free Press newspaper which publishes anti-semitic and racist books and features columns by Joe Sobran, James Traficant, Paul Craig Roberts,  and others. The organization promotes 9/11 conspiracy theories. Carto's many other projects included the Institute for Historical Review, which promotes Holocaust denial.

Biography

Early life 
Willis Carto was born in Fort Wayne, Indiana. He served in the United States Army in the Philippines in World War II and earned the Purple Heart when he was wounded by an enemy sniper. After leaving the military, he lived with his parents in Mansfield, Ohio. He studied law for a semester at the University of Cincinnati Law School. He later worked for Procter & Gamble and moved west to San Francisco, California where he worked for the Household Finance Company.

Liberty Lobby and publications
In 1955, Carto founded an organization called Liberty Lobby, which remained in operation under his control until 2001, when the organization was forced into bankruptcy as a result of a lawsuit. Liberty Lobby published The Spotlight newspaper between 1975 and 2001.

Carto and several Spotlight staff members and writers subsequently founded a new newspaper called American Free Press. The paper includes articles from syndicated columnists who have no direct ties to Carto or his organizations.

In 1966, Carto acquired control of The American Mercury via the Legion for the Survival of Freedom organization. It was published until 1980.

Political activism in the 1960s and 1970s
Carto ran a group called "Youth for George Wallace" to aid the third party presidential campaign of George Wallace in 1968. When the campaign failed, he converted what remained of the Youth for George Wallace organization into the National Youth Alliance. As National Chairman for the group, Carto recruited William Luther Pierce, who later became known for writing The Turner Diaries. Carto eventually lost control of the National Youth Alliance to Pierce who transformed it into the National Alliance, a white nationalist and white separatist political organization.

On September 10, 1971, the conservative magazine National Review published a detailed critique of Carto's activities up to that point. It was titled "Liberty Lobby - Willis Carto and his Fronts".

Historical revisionism and Holocaust denial
Carto founded the Institute for Historical Review in 1979. He was also the founder of a publishing company called Noontide Press, which published books on white racialism, including Yockey's Imperium and David Hoggan's The Myth of the Six Million, one of the first books to deny the Holocaust. Noontide Press later became closely associated with the IHR, and fell out of Carto's hands at the same time as the IHR did.

The IHR and Carto were sued in 1981 by public interest attorney William John Cox on behalf of Auschwitz survivor Mel Mermelstein. In that case, which was to eventually last eleven years, the court took "judicial notice of the fact that Jews were gassed to death at Auschwitz concentration camp in Poland during the summer of 1944." The court went on to state, "It is simply a fact." The law firm of Robert Von Esch, Jr., representing the defendants, settled with the plaintiff to remove themselves from the case by agreeing to pay $100,000 and an explicit apology for having filed an August 1986 libel suit by the IHR against Mermelstein. The Von Esches also formally acknowledged that Jews had been gassed at Auschwitz and that millions of Jews had perished in German wartime camps. On September 19, 1991, the plaintiffs withdrew complaints of libel, conspiracy to inflict emotional distress and intentional infliction of emotional distress, following Los Angeles Superior Court Judge Stephen M. Lachs' dismissal of the malicious prosecution portion of the case.

After losing control of Noontide Press and the IHR in a hostile takeover by former associates, Carto started another publication, The Barnes Review, with the focus also on Holocaust denial.

Populist Party (1984–1996)
In 1984, Carto was involved in starting a new political party called the Populist Party. It quickly fell out of his hands in a hostile takeover by disgruntled former associates.  Critics asserted that this Populist Party (not to be confused with the 19th-century People's Party, commonly known as "Populists") was little more than an electoral vehicle for current and former Ku Klux Klan and Christian Identity members. Olympic athlete Bob Richards (1984), David Duke (a founder of the Knights of the Ku Klux Klan and a future Louisiana state representative, 1988) and former Green Beret Bo Gritz (1992) were the Populist Party's only three presidential candidates.  It folded before it could nominate a candidate for the 1996 elections.

Radio and other activism
Carto's Liberty Lobby acquired the Sun Radio Network in December 1989, and attempted to use talk radio as a vehicle for espousing his views. It was eventually a financial failure.  Liberty Lobby and American Free Press also sponsored the Radio Free America talk show. Carto also formed the Foundation to Defend the First Amendment, one of several nonprofits Carto used to spread money to like-minded individuals and groups. Carto's Liberty Lobby also published The Barnes Review from 1994.

In 2004, Carto joined in signing David Duke's New Orleans Protocol on behalf of American Free Press. The New Orleans Protocol sought to "mainstream our cause" by reducing internecine warfare.
Carto was featured as a guest on The Political Cesspool, which represents "a philosophy that is pro-White." He spoke at meetings conducted by "Pastor" Thomas Robb, a Ku Klux Klan leader and Christian Identity advocate, and in 2015 participated in the ground breaking ceremony for the Christian Revival Research and Development Center being built on Robb's compound in Arkansas, along with Edward Fields and Canadian white supremacist Paul Fromm.

In 2007, Carto condemned the "genocidal maniacs like Vice President Cheney and commentator Bill O'Reilly" in their support of the Bush administration's attack on Iraq, and warned that "now the crooks are prodding America to attack Iran". His media outlets supported presidential candidate and congressman Ron Paul.

Death
Carto died on October 26, 2015, at the age of 89, reportedly from cardiac arrest. In February 2016, he was buried at Arlington National Cemetery (which the family had the right to request because he had earned a Purple Heart). Far-right and white nationalist Pastor Thomas A. Robb presided at the funeral.

Influences
Willis Carto was a devotee of the writings of Francis Parker Yockey, a far-rightist who heralded Adolf Hitler's Third Reich as the "European Imperium" against both Bolshevism and United States, which he considered Jewish-controlled. Carto adopted Yockey's book Imperium: The Philosophy of History and Politics as his own guiding ideology, and he obtained a 15-minute interview with Yockey on June 10, 1960, while the latter was held in prison for passport fraud. Yockey committed suicide six days later on June 16. Scholars have asserted that Yockey would have probably been forgotten without Carto's marketing of Imperium to the American audience.

Later, Carto would define his ideology as Jeffersonian and populist rather than National Socialist, particularly in Carto's 1982 book, Profiles in Populism. That book presented sympathetic profiles of several United States political figures including Thomas Jefferson, Andrew Jackson, and Henry Ford, as well as Catholic priest Father Charles Coughlin, who used radio to support of the policies of Adolf Hitler and Benito Mussolini.

References

Publications
 Profiles in Populism (as editor).  Old Greenwich, CT: Flag Press (1982) .
 Afterword to Best Witness: The Mermelstein Affair, by Michael C. Piper. America First Books. Washington: Center for Historical Review (1994)
 Populism vs. Plutocracy: The Universal Struggle (as editor). Liberty Lobby.

Further reading
Cox, William John. (2015) The Holocaust Case: Defeat of Denial. Little Elm, TX: eLectio Publishing.
Coogan, Kevin. (1999) Dreamer of the Day: Francis Parker Yockey and the Postwar Fascist International. Brooklyn, NY: Autonomedia.
Michael, George. (2008) Willis Carto and the American Far Right. Gainesville, FL: University Press of Florida.
Mintz, Frank P. (1985) The Liberty Lobby and the American Right: Race, Conspiracy, and Culture. Westport, CT: Greenwood Press.

External links
 FAQ: Willis Carto & The Institute for Historical Review 
 ADL: Willis A. Carto: Fabricating History 
 Extremist Files: Profile of Willis Carto from the Southern Poverty Law Center

1926 births
2015 deaths
Antisemitism in the United States
Anti-Zionism in the United States
Anti-Masonry
American anti-communists
American conspiracy theorists
American Holocaust deniers
American male non-fiction writers
United States Army personnel of World War II
American political writers
Burials at Arlington National Cemetery
John Birch Society members
Military personnel from Indiana
American neo-Nazis
People from Mansfield, Ohio
Political theories
Politics and race in the United States
Populist Party (United States, 1984)
Sexism in the United States
Non-interventionism
University of Cincinnati College of Law alumni
United States Army soldiers
Writers from Fort Wayne, Indiana